The Puruborá language of Brazil is one of the Tupian languages. It is also known as: Aurã, Cujubim, Burubora, Kuyubi, Migueleno, Miguelenho or Pumbora. Specifically it is spoken in the Brazilian state of Rondônia, in Costa Marques and around the headwaters of the Rio São Miguel tributary of the right bank of the Guaporé. It is nearly extinct, with only two native speakers (and two in the ethnic group) reported in 2002.

Vocabulary
Loukotka (1968) lists the following basic vocabulary items.

{| class="wikitable sortable"
! gloss !! Puruborá
|-
| one || múm
|-
| two || wewáb
|-
| three || bokód-wewáb
|-
| head || azyá
|-
| ear || zapetó
|-
| tooth || inká
|-
| hand || wapitái
|-
| woman || bagoyá
|-
| water || zereré
|-
| fire || ndamizyá
|-
| stone || muruá
|-
| maize || zyiá
|-
| tapir || taní
|}

References

External links 

 Map at Forvo.com
 ELAR archive of Documentation of Urgently Endangered Tupian Languages (including Puruborá)

Tupian languages
Endangered Tupian languages
Mamoré–Guaporé linguistic area